Charles Daniel d'Arrac de Vignes (24 January 1742 — )   was a French Navy officer. He fought in the War of American Independence, and taking part in the French operations in the Indian Ocean under Suffren.

Biography 
Arrac de Vignes joined the Navy as a Garde-Marine on 1 February 1756. He was promoted to Lieutenant on 1 October 1773, and to Captain on 9 May 1781. 

He served as first officer on the 64-gun Saint Michel, under Chevalier d'Aymar, when she came to reinforce the French squadron under Suffren in the Indian Ocean. 

Suffren promoted him to the command of the 64-gun Artésien. He took part in the Battle of Cuddalore, where his performance satisfied Suffren. 

After the war, he was amongst the captains that Suffren recommended for promotion He received a 600-livre pension in recognition of his service.

Sources and references 
 Notes

References

 Bibliography
 
 
 

French Navy officers
1742 births
French military personnel of the American Revolutionary War